Jana Perlberg (born 11 January 1966) is a German judoka. She competed in the women's extra-lightweight event at the 1996 Summer Olympics.

References

External links
 

1966 births
Living people
German female judoka
Olympic judoka of Germany
Judoka at the 1996 Summer Olympics
Sportspeople from Brandenburg an der Havel
20th-century German women